Lowest of the Low is an EP by American hardcore punk band Terror. It was released on Bridge 9 Records in 2003 and re-released on Trustkill Records in 2005. It was the band's only release recorded with bassist Richard Thurston.

Track listing

References

Terror (band) albums
2003 debut EPs
Hardcore punk EPs
Bridge 9 Records EPs